Indian wild pear is a common name for several plants and may refer to:

 Amelanchier canadensis, native to North America
 Pyrus pashia, native to southern Asia